Chang Chuan-chiung (born 23 October 1928) is a Taiwanese pharmacologist and professor emeritus of pharmacology at National Taiwan University. He is best known for having isolated bungarotoxin, a still-important agent in neurobiological research. He earned a B.S. from National Taiwan University in 1950, and a Ph.D. at the University of Tokyo in 1965. He later taught at National Taiwan University.

Chang Chuan-chiung was elected a member of Academia Sinica in 1976, within the division of life sciences, for his research into the isolation of bungarotoxin. He was the founding editor of the Journal of Biomedical Science, established by Taiwan's National Science Council in January 1994.

References

1928 births
Taiwanese pharmacologists
National Taiwan University alumni
Living people
Academic staff of the National Taiwan University
University of Tokyo alumni
Taiwanese expatriates in Japan
Members of Academia Sinica
Academic journal editors